Bârlădeanu or Bîrlădeanu is a Romanian surname which can refer to:

 Alexandru Bârlădeanu (1911–1997), a Romanian economist and politician
 Corneliu Barladeanu (born 1966), a Romanian orthodox bishop
 George Bârlădeanu (born 1988), a Romanian soccer player
 Ion Bîrlădeanu (born 1958), a Romanian sprint canoer
 Ion Bârlădeanu (sometimes spelled Bîrlădeanu) (born 1946), a Romanian collage artist
 Monica Bârlădeanu (born 1978), a Romanian actress

Romanian-language surnames